27 Brigade was a guerrilla force formed in Taichung, Taiwan, shortly after the outbreak of February 28 Incident. It was organized by Hsieh Hsueh-hung, a leading figure of Taiwanese Communist Party during the Japanese Administration Era, and was led by local Taichung scholar . The total strength of the brigade remains disputed, with sources putting it as low as 30 and as many as 4,000; however, it is agreed that the bulk of the force was made up of young students and discharged soldiers who had fought in World War II for the Empire of Japan. One source also claims that the 27 Brigade discovered a secret weapon cache left by the Japanese that contained enough weapons and ammunition to arm "three whole divisions," which remains disputed today.

On 15 March 1947, when the Kuomintang (KMT) forces closed-in on Taichung, the brigade sent several detachments out to engage. They did force the enemy force back, but also sustained heavy casualties and faced shortage of ammunition. The next day, the KMT force, after being reinforced and receiving heavy weaponry, assaulted positions held by the 27 Brigade, inflicted some casualties and forced them to retreat. At night, brigade leaders agreed to disband the brigade; brigade members hid their weapons and returned home shortly before midnight.

Legacy 
In 2017, a monument was erected in Taichung commemorating the actions of the 27 Brigade. A documentary, The 27 Brigade Documentary (2七部隊紀錄片), was produced in the same year.

References 

February 28 incident
Communism in Taiwan
History of Taiwan
Military units and formations disestablished in 1947
1947 establishments in Taiwan
Military units and formations established in 1947
1947 disestablishments in Taiwan